Lucas Tohătan (born 15 March 1999) is a Romanian professional basketball player for CSO Voluntari of the Liga Națională in Romania.

National team
Tohătan has been a member of the Romanian national basketball team.

References

External links
FIBA profile 
Profile at RealGM.com
Profile at Eurobasket.com

1999 births
Living people
CSO Voluntari players
CSU Sibiu players
Point guards
Romanian men's basketball players
Sportspeople from Baia Mare